The Third Unheard: Connecticut Hip Hop 1979–1983 is a compilation of old school hip hop music from Connecticut, a place not generally known for its rap music scene.

The album was released on compact disc and on vinyl by Stones Throw Records.

Track listing 
 "Rappin' With Mr. Magic" (Mr. Magic) – 9:11  
 "Get Up (And Go to School)" (Pookey Blow) – 6:14  
 "Potential 1980" (Mister Magic) – 9:53  
 "Party People [Remix]" (Rappermatical Five) – 6:49  
 "Million Dollar Legs" (Outlaw Four) – 5:37  
 "2001 Kazoo's" (Mister Magic, Positive Choice Band) – 6:48  
 "Be-Bop Convention Theme" (Forum Band) – 2:30
 "Shake Your Boody" (Chillie Three MCs) – 4:54  
 "Fill the Be-Bop" (LOD Crew) – 4:54  
 "Earth Break" (Mister Magic, Pookey Blow) – 5:33  
 "Ventriloquist Rap" (Willie & Woodie Brown) – 3:27  
 "I Just Wanna Dance" (Cuzz Band) – 3:23  
 "Showdown Rehearsal [Live]" (Second Showdown Crew) – 5:16  
 "Untitled Track" – 4:25

Musicians 
 Percussion: Roy Alexander, Augustine "Apple" Cerrino, 
 Guitar: Eugene Brown, Perry Mobley, Earl Whitaker
 Bass: Ed Cloud, Mark Moore, Doug Wimbish
 Drums: Steve Cloud, James "Louis" Moore, Pumpkin
 Turntables: DJ Starchild
 Horn: Fred Noble, Zadoc Noble

Album staff 
 Research: Dooley-O, Egon
 Photography: Ali D, Butchie B, Cool Rap, Joey Dee, DJ Starchild, Stephen Free, Pookey Blow
 Art direction: Jeff Jank

Technical staff 
 Executive producer: Peanut Butter Wolf
 Re-mastering: Dave Cooley
 Restoration: Dave Cooley
 Editing: Dave Cooley
 Engineering: Richard Robinson, DJ Starchild, Egon, 
 Annotation: Egon

References

External links
Stones Throw official site

2004 compilation albums
Stones Throw Records compilation albums
Hip hop compilation albums